A - Process Agent Service is a United States federal filing that designates legal agents upon which process may be served.  It pertains mostly to individuals or companies in the transportation and logistics industry, and it is often required before certain federal operating authorities can be granted within the United States. 
BOC stands for "blanket of coverage" and it typically assigns a person or business in each of the 50 US states to receive and forward legal documents. Process service agencies are third-party companies capable of granting BOC-3 filings. Process service agencies must employ or lease the services of individuals or entities within each state and be federally registered with the FMCSA in order to be able to grant a BOC-3.

While BOC-3 filings are relatively uniform, the process agent companies will vary.  Some merely do the BOC-3, while others also provide additional services such as DOT safety compliance, consultation, or various other materials and intel.

Law of the United States